Fame is the debut extended play by the South Korean singer Han Seung-woo. It was released on August 10, 2020 by Play M Entertainment.

Background and release 
Han Seung-woo was announced to be preparing a solo album in June 2020. Han is the first member of Victon to make a solo debut.

Han was the lyricist for all the songs on the album and participated in composing several of the songs.

The physical album was released in three versions.

Critical reception 
The lead single "Sacrifice" was described as combining "dark synth, trap and R&B with Seungwoo’s soaring vocals for a dynamic and emotional effect", as well as having "impressive vocal ad-libs and runs" with "powerful bursts of rap".

Commercial performance 
The album debuted at number two on the weekly Gaon Album Chart, and the title track "Sacrifice" debuted at number 97 on the weekly Gaon Digital Chart and at number one on the component Gaon Download Chart. The EP sold more than 30,000 copies domestically in its first day of sales. At the end of 2020, the album had sold 86,063 copies in South Korea.

Track listing 
Credits adapted from Melon.

Charts

Album

Weekly charts

Monthly chart

Year-end chart

Songs

Weekly charts

References

External Links 
Album Information on Melon

2020 debut EPs
Korean-language EPs